Egon Gutmann (20 January 1894 – 22 May 1955) was a German sculptor. His work was part of the sculpture event in the art competition at the 1936 Summer Olympics.

References

1894 births
1955 deaths
20th-century German sculptors
20th-century German male artists
German male sculptors
Olympic competitors in art competitions
People from Haut-Rhin